Andreas Michael Heiberg (1 December 1767 – 21 March 1815) was a Norwegian jurist and politician. He served as a representative at the Norwegian Constitutional Assembly.

Andreas Michael Heiberg was born at Straumsnes in Bergen, Norway. His father was a bailiff in Bergen who later served as district governor of Bornholm,  Denmark. He grew up in Denmark and took his legal examination in 1789. He first served as a bailiff in the town of Svaneke on Bornholm.  He was also district magistrate at Østre Herred in Bornholm.  From 1810 he was a local magistrate and town clerk in Fredrikstad in Østfold.

He represented Fredrikstad at the Norwegian Constituent Assembly at Eidsvoll in 1814. At the assembly, he supported the independence party (Selvstendighetspartiet).

References

External links
Representantene på Eidsvoll 1814 (Cappelen Damm AS)
Men of Eidsvoll (eidsvollsmenn)

Related Reading
 Holme Jørn (2014) De kom fra alle kanter - Eidsvollsmennene og deres hus (Oslo: Cappelen Damm) 

1767 births
1815 deaths
Politicians from Bergen
Lawyers from Bergen
Østfold politicians
Fathers of the Constitution of Norway